Khirbet al-Malih is a Palestinian hamlet of over 200 people in the Tubas Governorate of the northeastern West Bank, located  east of Tubas.

History
Khirbet al-Malih dates back to the Ottoman period of rule in Palestine when Turkish people first settled it. The current residents are from the Daraghmah clan who have dwelt in the area for 50 years. They came from nearby Tubas, and as well as Hebron in search of grazing and water as they were farmers and bred animals. Al-Malih means "salty" and the village's name is derives from the nearby al-Malih spring, which has salty water.

In 2002, a local development committee was appointed by the Local Authorities Minister of the Palestinian National Authority to govern Khirbet al-Malih composing of six members.

Geography and climate
It borders the Jordan River in the east, the hamlet of al-Farisiya and the Jordan Valley to the north, and Tayasir and Khirbet al-'Atuf to the south. 

The total area of Khirbet al-Malih village is roughly 19,000 dunams, which represents approximately 2.7% of the Tubas Governorate's land area. About 500 dunams are populated area, whilst 12,000 dunams are agricultural lands, 4,000 dunams are covered by forests and 3,500 dunams are areas confiscated by Israel.

Demographics
In the 1997 census by the Palestinian Central Bureau of Statistics (PCBS), the total population of Khirbet al-Malih was 151 people, of which 77 were males and 74 females. The majority of the population (56.3%) are under the age of 20. There were 25 households resident in 27 housing units. According to the PCBS, Khirbet al-Malih had a population of 206 in mid-year 2006—an increase of 35.4% from 1997. The village is composed of four families: Darawsheh (60%), Zowahra (20%), Majedah (10%) and Bashareaat and Bani Audah (10%). There is no Palestinian refugee population in the village.

Economy
The residents of Khirbet al-Malih are totally dependent on agricultural activities and 90% of the working inhabitants raise local animals and agricultural production is the main livelihood for them, forming the main source of income. Of the 6,160 dunams of land that is cultivated, 80% are field crops, while 20% are vegetables. Together with the hamlet of al-Farisiya, there are 485 heads of cattle, 430 goats, and 4,700 sheep. 

After the Second Intifada that began in 2000, few (10%) work in the Israeli labor market because fewer workers have been given permits to work inside Israel. In 2000, the average household income was 1,500 NIS, but in 2005 it was 500 NIS, a decrease of 65%. According to mayor Arif Daraghmeh, Khirbet al-Malih's residents are not permitted to build permanent structures by the Israel Civil Administration, since the village is located in Area C. Despite living there for generations, Daraghmeh states the village regularly receives demolition orders, compelling them to live in tents or mudbrick housing unconnected to the water grid, while the Israeli settlers of the nearby moshav, Shadmot Mehola, dwell in a fenced community, with two-story homes, street lamps and playgrounds.

References

External links
Welcome to Kh. al-Malih Palestine Remembered.
 Al Malih (Fact Sheet), Applied Research Institute–Jerusalem, ARIJ,  February, 2006
Khirbet Al Malih profile, ARIJ

Villages in the West Bank